Sabalia sericaria is a moth in the family Brahmaeidae (older classifications placed it in Lemoniidae). It was described by Gustav Weymer in 1896.

References

Brahmaeidae
Moths described in 1896